The Huansu H5 is a MPV produced by Huansu, a brand of the Chonqing Bisu Automotive Corporation, which is closely related to Beiqi-Yinxiang, a joint venture between Beijing Auto (Beiqi) and the Yinxiang Group.

Overview

The Huansu H5 was launched in 2017, and rides on the same platform as the Bisu T5. The Huansu H5 is a 6-seater vehicle with a wheelbase of 2760 mm. The vehicle is 4750 mm long, 1800 mm wide and also 1800 mm high. The curb weight is 1620 kg.

Powertrain
The Huansu H5 is powered by a four-cylinder gasoline engine with four-valve technology. With the help of a turbocharger, it produces 98 kW from a displacement of 1298 cm3. The engine is mated to a CVT (continuously variable transmission).

Sales
The first Huansu H5 was registered in China in September 2017. In 2017, there were 2132 H5s sold. In the two following years, there were 1382 and 399. The last units were handed down in July 2019.

References 

Cars introduced in 2017
Minivans
Front-wheel-drive vehicles
2010s cars
Cars of China